

Match details

Top 14 Final